Bremen is an unincorporated community in northeastern Wells County, North Dakota, United States.  It lies northeast of the city of Fessenden, the county seat of Wells County.  Its elevation is 1,549 feet (472 m).  The post office has closed, and the residents of the small community use the post office and postal code of New Rockford in neighboring Eddy County.

References

Unincorporated communities in Wells County, North Dakota
Unincorporated communities in North Dakota